Cryptandra graniticola is a flowering plant in the family Rhamnaceae and is endemic to southern Western Australia. It is an upright, spreading shrub with spiny branchlets, linear to narrowly egg-shaped leaves and clusters of white, tube-shaped flowers.

Description
The upper surface of the leaves is glabrous and the edges are rolled under, concealing most of the lower surface. Flowering mainly occurs from July to October.

Taxonomy and naming
Cryptandra graniticola was first formally described in 1995 by Barbara Lynette Rye in the journal Nuytsia from specimens collected near Norseman in 1951 by Robert Royce. The specific epithet (graniticola ) means "granite inhabitant".

Distribution and habitat
This cryptandra grows in shallow sandy soil, often on granite outcrops or hills and is found from Mount Day to near Lake Cowan in the Coolgardie, Esperance Plains, Great Victoria Desert, Mallee and Murchison bioregions of Western Australia.

Conservation status
Cryptandra graniticola is listed as "not threatened" by the Government of Western Australia Department of Biodiversity, Conservation and Attractions.

References

graniticola
Rosales of Australia
Flora of Western Australia
Plants described in 1995
Taxa named by Barbara Lynette Rye